Yasser Arafat (1929–2004) was an Egyptian-born Palestinian leader. 

Yasir Arafat may also refer to:

Yasir Arafat (cricketer), (born 1982) Pakistani Test cricketer
Yasir Arafat (cricketer, born 1984), Pakistani first-class cricketer
Yasser Arafat International Airport

See also
Yasir Arafat Mishu (born 1998), Bangladeshi cricketer

Arafat, Yasir